Bogayev or Bogaev (feminine Bogayeva or Bogaeva) is a surname of Russian origin. Notable people with the surname include:

Barbara Bogaev, American radio journalist
Dmitry Bogayev (born 1994), Russian footballer
Oleg Bogayev (born 1970), Russian playwright

See also
Bugayev

Russian-language surnames